Meryl Laura Mark (1 March 1938 — 16 September 2006) was a South African tennis player.

Mark grew up in Boksburg on the East Rand and is the elder sister of tennis player John Hammill. She competed briefly on the international circuit, notably reaching the third round of the 1959 Wimbledon Championships.

In 1961 she married Australian tennis player Bob Mark and couple settled in South Africa.

References

1938 births
2006 deaths
South African female tennis players
People from Boksburg
20th-century South African women